Antonia Baronin Pilars de Pilar, née Antonia Gabriele Marie Josefa Huberta Elisabeth Maximiliane Freiin von Oer-Egelborg (10 April 1872 – 7 February 1946) was from 1894 to 1898 Court lady of the Duchess Marie of Mecklenburg-Schwerin née Princess Marie of Windisch-Graetz and from 1911 to 1944 Court lady of Marie's daughter, the Duchess Marie Antoinette of Mecklenburg-Schwerin. Antonia married Polish poet, Baron Ladislaus Pilars de Pilar. They had 3 Children: Eduard (1899–1971), Antoinette (1901–1989) and Gabriel (1904–1978). Antonia was the daughter of Friedrich Freiherr von Oer-Egelborg (1842–1896), chamberlain of Prince Karl II of Isenburg and Gabriele née Countess Khuen von Belasi (1841–1923). Her son Gabriel married in 1935 Anna, Countess von Stubenberg.

Life
Antonia was born in Birstein, where she grew up at the court of the Prince of Isenburg where her father was chamberlain. In 1894 she became lady in waiting to Duchess Marie von Mecklenburg-Schwerin, née princess of Windisch-Graetz and wife of the Duke Paul Frederick of Mecklenburg. At 9. of May 1898 she married in Birstein Ladislaus Baron Pilars de Pilar, a Polish poet from Opatówek. They moved to Struga, at that time a small suburb of Warsaw. Ladislaus was running there a factory for safes and armour plates. In 1906 some Polish insurgents burned down his house and his fabric. So Antonia flew with a nanny and her three children hidden in a hay waggon to her relatives close to Münster. Her cousin, Paula Freifrau von Ketteler née von Oer was looking for a playfellow for her only child Wilderich. So Paula offered the family a Castle Störmede, close the Ketteler's main Castle Schwarzenraben.

In 1911 she restarted her career as a lady in waiting of the duchess Marie's daughter, Duchess Marie Antoinette of Mecklenburg-Schwerin. During World War I Antonia and Antoinette were both serving at the Red Cross where she was given the Red Cross Medal of Prussia and several other medals of the house of Mecklenburg-Schwerin. After the war Antonia joined Antoinette travelling through Europe. As Antoinette died in 1944 in Bled in former Yugoslavia Antonia returned to Störmede, where she died aged 73.

External links
 Library of Opatówek

1872 births
1946 deaths
Barons Pilars de Pilar
Barons Oer
German ladies-in-waiting
Russian noble families
German baronesses